Nicholas Tufton may refer to:

Nicholas Tufton, 1st Earl of Thanet (1578–1631), English peer and MP for Peterborough
Nicholas Tufton, 3rd Earl of Thanet (1631–1679), English peer